Mihály Nagymarosi (6 October 1919 in Nagymaros – 7 September 2002 in Nagymaros) was a Hungarian football midfielder, who played for Újpest FC, as well as representing 13 times the Hungarian national football team between 1942 and 1950. He was a member of the Hungarian Golden Team.

External links
 Player profile at sportmuzeum.hu 

1919 births
2002 deaths
Hungarian footballers
Hungary international footballers
Újpest FC players
People from Nagymaros
Association football midfielders
Sportspeople from Pest County